Mardinspor is a Turkish football club located in Mardin, Turkey. They play their home games in Mardin Sehir in Mardin. The club was founded in 1969 when the clubs Timurspor, Mezopotamyaspor, Gençlik and Spor joined together.

League participations
 TFF First League: 1980–1986, 1988–89, 2004–08
 TFF Second League: 2001–04, 2008–12
 TFF Third League: 1969–73, 1986–88, 1989–94, 1995–01, 2012–13
 Turkish Regional Amateur League: 2013–15
 Amateur League: 1973–80, 1994–95

Achievements
 TFF Second League
 Winners (1): 2004 
 TFF Third League
 Winners (2): 1988, 2001

External links
 Mardinspor on TFF.org

 
Sport in Mardin
Football clubs in Turkey
Association football clubs established in 1969
Association football clubs disestablished in 2015
1969 establishments in Turkey
2015 disestablishments in Turkey